,or Pape Faye, born June 22, 1986, is a Senegal-born Japanese professional basketball player. He was selected by the Yokohama B-Corsairs with the 8th overall pick in the 2011 bj League draft. He currently plays for the Levanga Hokkaido of the Japanese B.League. He was a member of Japan's national basketball team in 2016.

Career statistics 

|-
| align="left" | 2011-12
| align="left" | Yokohama
| 51 ||13 || 16.7|| .533 || .000 || .410 || 5.3 || 0.4 || 0.5 || 0.2 ||  5.9
|-
| align="left" | 2012-13
| align="left" | Yokohama
| 52 ||34 || 24.5 || .504 || --- || .550 || 8.2|| 0.5 || 0.6 || 0.9 || 9.4 
|-
| align="left" |  2013-14
| align="left" | Chiba
| 4 || 3|| 18.0 || .533 || --- || .214 || 5.5 || 0 || 0.3 || 0.5 ||  4.8
|-
| align="left" |  2014-15
| align="left" | Hiroshima
| 54 ||54 || 28.7 || .517 || .000 || .436 || 8.9 || 1.0 || 0.7 || 0.9 ||  10.8
|-
| align="left" | 2015-16
| align="left" | Niigata
| 52||50 ||34.0 ||.521 ||.000 ||.486 ||9.9 || 3.4||1.0 ||0.7 ||11.4
|-
| align="left" | 2016-17
| align="left" | Yokohama
| 60||30 ||26.0 ||.513 ||.091 ||.370 ||7.5 || 1.2||0.3 ||0.3 ||7.9
|-
| align="left" | 2017-18
| align="left" | Fukuoka
| 60||56 ||24.8 ||.486 ||.000 ||.484 ||7.6 || 2.1||0.5 ||0.3 ||8.4
|-
| align="left" | 2018-19
| align="left" | Osaka
| 60||19 ||21.4 ||.519 ||.000 ||.509 ||5.0 || 1.0||0.5 ||0.2 ||8.1
|-

Playoffs 

|-
|style="text-align:left;"|2016-17
|style="text-align:left;"|Yokohama
| 3 || 3 || 24.04 || .391 || .000 || .250 || 7.0 || 1.0 || 1.0 || 0 || 7.0
|-
|style="text-align:left;"|2016-17
|style="text-align:left;"|Yokohama
| 1 || 0 || 26.36 || .500 || .000 || .333 || 7.0 || 1.0 || 4.0 || 0 || 7.0
|-
|style="text-align:left;"|2017-18
|style="text-align:left;"|Fukuoka
| 5 || 5 || 22.10 || .607 || .000 || .444 || 6.0 || 1.2 || 0.8 || 0.4 || 7.6
|-

Early cup games 

|-
|style="text-align:left;"|2018
|style="text-align:left;"|Osaka
| 2 || 0 || 25.32 || .588 || .000 || .500 || 5.5 || 0.5 || 0.5 || 0 || 13.0
|-

References

1987 births
Living people
Chiba Jets Funabashi players
Hiroshima Dragonflies players
Japanese men's basketball players
Japanese people of Senegalese descent
Levanga Hokkaido players
Osaka Evessa players
Niigata Albirex BB players
Rizing Zephyr Fukuoka players
Basketball players from Dakar
Yokohama B-Corsairs players
Centers (basketball)